U-verse TV is a DirecTV brand of IPTV service. Launched on June 26, 2006, U-verse included broadband Internet (now AT&T Internet or AT&T Fiber), IP telephone (now AT&T Phone), and IPTV (U-verse TV) services in 48 states.

On February 25, 2021, AT&T announced that it would spin off DirecTV into a separate entity, containing the U-verse TV and AT&T TV services, selling a 30% stake to TPG Capital while retaining a 70% stake in the new standalone company. The deal was closed on August 2, 2021.

History
The current U-verse TV ultimately derives from the IPTV part of the former AT&T U-verse triple-play telecommunications service.

SBC Communications announced its plans for a fiber-optic network and Internet Protocol television (IPTV) deployment in 2004 and unveiled the name "U-verse" (formerly "Project Lightspeed") for the suite of network services in 2005. SBC eventually became AT&T in late 2005, and the AT&T name was applied for the service. AT&T U-verse was commercially launched June 26, 2006, in San Antonio.

By the third quarter of 2012, AT&T had 4.3 million TV subscribers, 2.7 million Phone subscribers and 7.1 million Internet.

At an analyst meeting in August 2015, following AT&T's acquisition of satellite provider DirecTV, AT&T announced plans for a new "home entertainment gateway" platform that will converge DirecTV and U-verse around a common platform based upon DirecTV hardware with "very thin hardware profiles". AT&T Entertainment and Internet Services CEO John Stankey explained that the new platform would offer "single truck roll installation for multiple products, live local streaming, improved content portability, over-the-top integration for mobile broadband, and user interface re-engineering."

In February 2016, Bloomberg reported that AT&T was in the process of phasing out the U-verse IPTV service by encouraging new customers to purchase DirecTV satellite service instead, and by ending the production of new set-top boxes for the service. An AT&T spokesperson denied that U-verse was being shut down and explained that the company was "leading its video marketing approach with DirecTV" to "realize the many benefits" of the purchase, but would still recommend U-verse TV if it better-suited a customer's needs. AT&T CFO John Stephens had also previously stated that DirecTV's larger subscriber base as a national service gave the service a higher degree of leverage in negotiating carriage deals, thus resulting in lower content costs.

On May 16, 2016, AT&T acquired Quickplay Media, a cloud-based platform that powers over-the-top video services.

On September 19, 2016, AT&T announced that the "U-verse" brand would no longer apply to its broadband and phone services, renaming them "AT&T Internet" and "AT&T Phone", respectively.

In selected markets, AT&T began to replace AT&T U-verse TV with a new service based on its DirecTV Now platform, AT&T TV, in August 2019. 

On April 3, 2020, AT&T began announcing that U-verse would no longer be available to new customers. New customers ended up receiving AT&T TV for TV service. However, by September 2020 AT&T spokesman Ryan Oliver, when asked if AT&T was still selling U-verse, said that “U-verse is available in select locations,” and "AT&T never stopped selling U-verse", even though an AT&T customer attempted to order U-verse, but ended up receiving 2 boxes of AT&T TV instead.

On August 2, 2021, the spin off of DirecTV, AT&T TV and U-verse was completed. It is now a wholly owned subsidiary of DirecTV.

Services

AT&T used the Ericsson Mediaroom platform to deliver U-verse TV via IPTV from the headend to the consumer's receiver, required for each TV. Transmissions use digital H.264 (MPEG-4 AVC) encoding, compared to the existing deployments of MPEG-2 codec and the discontinued analog cable TV system. The receiver box does not have a RF tuner, but is an IP multicast client that requests the channel or "stream" desired. U-Verse TV supports up to four/six active streams at once, depending on service tier. The system uses individual unicasts for video on demand, central time shifting, start-over services and other programs.

U-verse TV packages 
AT&T grouped its general channels into progressive packages (U-family, U200, U300, and U450); each adds channels to the package before it, with rare exceptions. All subscribers receive at least the equivalent of the U-family package, which also includes 65 of the 75 Stingray Music channels. Many U-family channels were also available on the historical U-basic package. The historical U400 package is identical to the U450 package, except that U450 automatically includes the HD Services package.

Specialty channels were grouped into a la carte packages, which can be combined with the general packages: The Sports Package; ESPN College Extra; Fox Soccer Plus HD; NBA League Pass; HD Services; HD Premium Tier; Paquete Español; and Adult. Paquete Español can be combined with a higher-tier package and is then called U200 Latino, U300 Latino, or U450 Latino. Additionally, channels grouped as Internationals are available a la carte in language groups or singly, and a number of premium movie packages are available to premium package or higher-tier subscribers. High-definition TV technology is required to access HD channels.

U-verse during most of its lifespan had 5 member channels: ATTention (channels 400, 962 in SD and 1100, 1400, 2500 in HD), Buzz (channels 300, 851, 961 in SD and 1000, 1300, 1851 in HD), Front Row (channels 100, 847 in SD and 1847 in HD), Showcase (channels 800, 964 in SD and 1800 in HD), Sports (channels 600, 801, 963 in SD and 1600, 1801 in HD), and U-verse Movies (channels 200, 800, 945, 960 in SD and 1200, 1850 in HD) . These removed from the AT&T U-verse TV channel lineup on February 26, 2016.

Channel groupings 
Time-delayed: Some channels have both East Coast and West Coast feeds, airing the same programming with a three-hour delay on the latter feed; the delay represents the time-zone difference between Eastern (UTC -5/-4) and Pacific (UTC -8/-7). The west feed is specified by adding "- West" to the name of the east feed. For certain time-delayed channels, both the east and west feeds are available to all subscribers; otherwise only the east feed (for the Central and Eastern time zones) or only the west feed (for the Pacific and Mountain time zones) is available, even though two channel numbers are assigned to the feeds. With the exception of California, Nevada, and westernmost parts of Texas and Kansas, the U-verse 22-state availability region is available  within the Central and Eastern time zones.
High-definition: With few exceptions, the numbers of high-definition TV channels are found by adding 1000 to the standard-definition television channel number, and HD callsigns are found by appending "HD" to the callsign of the SD channel (with or without a space). West feed callsigns typically append "-W" (or "HDW"). Most HD channels appear in the HD Services package, while the HD Premium Tier package contains approximately 25 additional premium channels.
Local: All local broadcast channels are identified by the station's callsign and over-the-air virtual digital channel number (e.g., "WDAF-4" for Fox affiliate WDAF-TV in Kansas City, Missouri), with a few exceptions (WDJT-TV, the CBS affiliate in Milwaukee is carried on its preferred cable channel 5/1005 slot on U-verse rather than its actual channel number 58 to keep it grouped with major network affiliates, for instance). Local stations appear in the ranges 2–69 and 1002–1069. A national channel may also appear as a local channel or affiliate in the minimum package in available markets; in some such cases, the national channel is not available in the market where the local channel or affiliate appears.
Sports: Channels in the 600s are national sports channels, available to varying tiers. The Sports Package is included with the U450 package or can be added onto a lower-tier package.
Regional: Channels in the 700s are regional (excluding non-premium movie channels in the 790s). Subscribers each automatically receive channels that are regional to them, based on geography, in standard- and high-definition. Subscribers who wish to receive out-of-market regional channels (typically for sporting) must subscribe to the HD Premium Tier package, which includes most of the other regional channels. According to league rules, sports blackouts do apply, but rebroadcasts of games may be available out-of-market.

Carriage negotiations 
 AT&T removed Hallmark Channel and Hallmark Movie Channel from AT&T U-verse TV effective September 1, 2010, due to a carriage dispute. An AT&T spokesperson stated, "Hallmark has refused to provide AT&T and its customers with a fair deal—one that is no worse than similarly-sized and smaller providers—and refused to adhere to key obligations under our current deal", while Hallmark Channel's president and CEO Bill Abbott said he was "...stunned by the apparent disregard for the facts ... If they are really serious, my team and I are ready for truly fair negotiations." After the removal, the channels temporarily provided free previews of Starz Kids & Family and Turner Classic Movies.  Crown Media Holdings operates the two Hallmark channels in the United States.
 Univision tlnovelas and Univision Deportes Network began on U-verse on May 11, 2012, after a carriage agreement was signed with Univision Communications.
 Just prior to the 2010 series premiere of the AMC program Mad Men, AT&T and Rainbow Media resolved a carriage dispute without interruption to any channels. AT&T stated that Rainbow, "...had been trying to force the renegotiation of a contract for one of their other channels that is not yet expired." It was speculated that this additional contract renegotiation was for Sundance Channel and was successfully concluded, due to Rainbow Media's summation, "We're pleased to have reached an agreement with AT&T for AMC, WE tv, IFC and Sundance Channel that truly recognizes the value of our networks."
 HGTV, the Food Network, the DIY Network, the Cooking Channel, and Great American Country were temporarily inaccessible between November 5 and November 7, 2010, due to a carriage dispute with Scripps Networks. U-verse vice president Brian Shay stated afterward that AT&T had received a "fair deal".
 U-verse picked up the Longhorn Network on August 31, 2012, increasing its availability to 12.9% of the Austin, Texas television market.
 On January 15, 2013, U-verse came to terms with Disney on a new wide-ranging multiple-year carriage agreement for all Disney, ESPN and ABC Networks, which included the addition of Disney Junior.
 On February 28, 2015, 46 Music Choice channels and MC Play were removed and were replaced by 75 Stingray Music channels.
 On October 26, 2015, U-verse came to terms with Tribune Media on a new wide-ranging multiple-year carriage agreement for all Tribune stations, which includes the addition of WGN America.
 AT&T removed Univision, UniMás, Galavisión, Univision Deportes Network and Univision tlnovelas from AT&T U-verse effective March 4, 2016, due to a carriage dispute. Although U-verse was in an integration process with DirecTV, which became a subsidiary of AT&T, it did not affect DirecTV customers during the process. All of Univision's channels were later returned to the U-verse lineup on March 24, 2016.

See also
DirecTV
Verizon Fios
Prism TV
Fiber-optic communication
Optik TV
Vonage
Bell Fibe TV
Fibe
Voice over IP
Google Fiber

References

External links

AT&T U-verse Community
DSLReports.com U-verse Forum

DirecTV
Former AT&T subsidiaries
Streaming television
Telecommunications in the United States